Canvas 2: Niji Iro no Sketch is a 24 episode anime television series directed by Itsuro Kawasaki, based on a Japanese visual novel called Canvas 2: Akane Iro no Palette, which has made transitions into many media other than an anime, such as manga, light novels, and drama CDs. The anime is produced by studio ZEXCS, and aired on a Japanese network called TV Kanagawa from October 3, 2005 to March 27, 2006. Canvas 2: Niji Iro no Sketch is licensed in North America by Kadokawa Pictures USA. The episodes were sold in two separate box sets, containing twelve episodes each.

The episodes were simulcast on Crunchyroll, an American international online community focused on streaming East Asian media. The episodes are named after various different colors.

The opening theme is "Plastic Smile" by Honey Bee (YURIA), and the ending theme is "NA NA IRO" by Sweets Tankentai.

Canvas 2: Niji Iro no Sketch (2005-06)

References

External links
Official anime site

Canvas 2: Niji Iro no Sketch